Brian Jacob Smith (born October 12, 1981) is an American actor, known for his role as Will Gorski in the Netflix-produced series Sense8, Lieutenant Matthew Scott in the military science fiction television series Stargate Universe, and his Tony Award-nominated role as Jim O'Connor (The Gentleman Caller) in the 2013 revival of The Glass Menagerie.

Early life and education 
Smith is a native of Allen, Texas. He studied at the Quad C Theatre program at Collin County Community College in Plano, Texas. After he was an apprentice for one year at Stephens College in Columbia, Missouri, Smith moved to New York City to attend the Juilliard School Drama Division's four-year acting program (Group 36: 2003–2007). Smith graduated from Juilliard with a Bachelor of Fine Arts degree.

Career 
While enrolled at Collin College, Smith worked as theatre technician. He was later cast as Alex in A Clockwork Orange in a Quad C Theatre production to a positive review from the Dallas Observer. In 2005, he portrayed Trey, a gay man facing intolerance from the son of a fundamentalist preacher, in Hate Crime, an independent film that featured at gay and lesbian film festivals around the United States.

Upon graduating from Juilliard, Smith briefly considered joining the US Army due to several setbacks in his career.

Smith eventually received acting roles in two more independent films, Red Hook and The War Boys. In 2008, he appeared on Broadway in the play Come Back, Little Sheba as the character Turk. Smith was cast as Lieutenant Matthew Scott, a lead role in the 2009 Stargate television series, Stargate Universe, until its cancellation in 2010. He also guest-starred on Law & Order in 2009.

In 2011, Smith recurred on The CW's Gossip Girl and starred in the SyFy original film Red Faction: Origins. In April 2012, he began his run as Andrei in the hit Broadway show, The Columnist, which ended in July 2012. His next projects included the mini-series Coma from producer Tony Scott and an appearance on Warehouse 13 for SyFy.

From September 2013 to February 2014, he played The Gentleman Caller in a Broadway production of Tennessee Williams's The Glass Menagerie at the Booth Theatre. This role earned him 2014 Drama Desk and Tony Award nominations as Outstanding Featured Actor in a Play. In 2015, he appeared in the pilot episode of Quantico as one of the new FBI recruits.

Smith was a lead cast member on the Netflix original series Sense8 (2015–2018) playing the character Will Gorski. He followed up with main roles on Treadstone, a serial spin-off of the Bourne films, and the BBC World War II drama mini series World on Fire in 2019.

Personal life 
On November 7, 2019, Smith came out as gay in an interview with Attitude.

Filmography

Theatre

Awards and nominations

References

External links
 
 GateWorld: Brian J. Smith cast in Stargate Universe
 "Boldly Going From Collin County Community College to SciFi's New Stargate Series"  Unfair Park, the Dallas Observer blog

1981 births
21st-century American male actors
American male film actors
American male stage actors
American male television actors
American gay actors
Juilliard School alumni
LGBT people from Texas
Living people
Male actors from Dallas
People from Allen, Texas
21st-century LGBT people